Evenus is a butterfly genus in the family Lycaenidae, with species ranging from North to South America.

Species list
 Evenus regalis (Cramer, 1775) – type species
 Evenus coronata (Hewitson, 1865)– crowned hairstreak
 Evenus gabriela (Cramer, 1775)
 Evenus batesii (Hewitson, 1865)
 Evenus candidus (Druce, 1907)
 Evenus sponsa (Möschler, 1877)
 Evenus sumptuosa (Druce, 1907)
 Evenus tagyra (Hewitson, 1865)
 Evenus floralia (Druce, 1907)
 Evenus temathea (Hewitson, 1865)
 Evenus satyroides (Hewitson, 1865)
 Evenus latreillii (Hewitson, 1865)
 Evenus felix (Neild and Balint, 2014)

References

External links

Funet Taxonomy Distribution Image of Evenus regalis
Evenus images at EOL

Eumaeini
Lycaenidae of South America
Lycaenidae genera
Taxa named by Jacob Hübner